The 2017–18 season was Motherwell's thirty-third consecutive season in the top flight of Scottish football and the fifth in the newly established Scottish Premiership, having been promoted from the Scottish First Division at the end of the 1984–85 season. Motherwell also competed in the League Cup and the Scottish Cup losing to Celtic in both finals

Season Review
On 2 June, Motherwell announced that they had signed Alex Fisher and Gaël Bigirimana, from Inverness C.T. and Coventry City respectively, on two-year contracts and that James McFadden had left the club. Three days later Motherwell announced their third signing of the season, Craig Tanner on a two-year contract from Reading. Motherwell announced their fourth signing of the summer on 6 June, goalkeeper Trevor Carson from Hartlepool United on a three-year contract. Russell Griffiths became Motherwell's sixth signing of the season on 21 June, signing a one-year contract with the club after his Everton contract had expired.
Also on 21 June, Keith Lasley hung up his boots and became the club's new assistant manager. Motherwell announced their seventh summer signing on 30 June, Charles Dunne from Oldham Athletic.

On 5 July, Motherwell announced the signing of Cédric Kipré on a one-year contract after his release from Leicester City. Craig Clay left the club on 17 July to sign with Leyton Orient.

Young striker George Newell signed a one-year contract with Motherwell on 24 July, with Ellis Plummer joining on 2 August.

On 14 August, it was announced that Stephen McManus had decided to retire from professional football and take up a coaching role with Motherwell.

6 weeks into his one-year deal, Cédric Kipré signed a one-year extension with Motherwell on 23 August.

On 31 August, transfer deadline day, Ben Heneghan joined Sheffield United for an undisclosed fee, whilst Jack McMillan joined Livingston on loan until January 2018, and PJ Morrison joined Clyde on loan until January 2018. Liam Grimshaw returned to the club from Preston North End, and Peter Hartley joined the club on a one-year loan deal.

On 13 October, manager Stephen Robinson extended his contract until 2020, and midfielder Allan Campbell signed a new contract until 2021.

On 14 December, Motherwell announced that they had agreed to the transfer of Louis Moult to Preston North End for an undisclosed fee on 1 January 2018.

On 16 December, Motherwell announced the signing of Gennadios Xenodochof on a short-term contract until the middle January 2018.

On 3 January, Motherwell signed Curtis Main to an eighteen-month contract from Portsmouth.

On 5 January, Motherwell announced that Steven Hammell would retire at the end of January to take up the role of the club's Academy Director.

On 9 January, Motherwell signed Nadir Çiftçi on loan from Celtic until the end of the season. A week later, 16 January, Motherwell signed Tom Aldred on loan until the end of the season from Bury.

Following the completion of his loan deal, Jack McMillan signed for Livingston permanently on 19 January 2018. On 23 January, Peter Hartley made his loan move permanent, signing until the summer of 2020. On 26 January, Alex Fisher left the club to sign for Yeovil Town.

On 31 January, transfer deadline day, Motherwell signed Stephen Hendrie on loan from Southend United until the end of the season, whilst Adam Livingstone joined East Fife on loan for the remainder of the season.

On 13 April, Motherwell announced that defenders Cédric Kipré, Charles Dunne and Richard Tait all had extended their contracts until the summer of 2020, whilst Ryan Bowman had extended his contract until the summer of 2019.

On 16 May, Motherwell announced that midfielders Liam Grimshaw and Andy Rose had signed new one-year contracts with the club.

On 21 May, Motherwell announced that Russell Griffiths, Ellis Plummer, Deimantas Petravičius, Luke Watt and Dylan King would be leaving the club at the end of their contracts, whilst Tom Aldred, Stephen Hendrie and Nadir Çiftçi would be returning to their parent clubs after their loan deals had expired. Shea Gordon, Adam Livingstone, Barry Maguire, James Scott, PJ Morrison, Jason Krones, Jordan Armstrong, Shaun Bowers and Alfredo Agyeman were all offered new contracts.

Transfers

In

Loans in

Out

 Moult's transfers was announced on the above date, but were not finalised until 1 January 2018.

Loans out

Released

Trial

Squad

Left club during season

Friendlies

Competitions

Premiership

League table

Results by round

Results summary

Results

Scottish Cup

Final

League Cup

Group stage

Table

Matches

Knockout stage

Final

Challenge Cup

Squad statistics

Appearances

|-
|colspan="14"|Players away from the club on loan:
|-
|colspan="14"|Players who left Motherwell during the season:

|}

Goal scorers

Disciplinary record

See also
 List of Motherwell F.C. seasons

Notes

References

External links
 Motherwell F.C. Website
 BBC My Club Page
 Motherwell F.C. Newsnow

Motherwell F.C. seasons
Motherwell